Sant'Angelo in Lizzola is a frazione of the comune  of Vallefoglia in the province of Pesaro e Urbino in the Italian region Marche. It was a separate comune until 2013.

The main parish church is the former collegiate church of San Michele Arcangelo.

References

Cities and towns in the Marche